is a Japanese seinen manga series written and illustrated by Kanzaki Yuuya. It is set to be adapted into a TV series of the same name and was released in January 2015.

Plot
Ikuo Ryuuzaki and Danno Tatsuya are 2 orphaned boys who were looked after by a person they called 'sensei'. Following their sensei's brutal murder, the two vow to hunt down the killers and the police officers who neglected to properly investigate the case.

15 years later, Ryuuzaki is a police detective and Tatsuya has become the leader of a group of mobsters. Helping each other out behind the scenes, they strive to rise to the tops of their respective fields so that they may exact their vengeance.

Media

Live-action drama

References

External links
 

Manga series
Seinen manga